Grigor Danielyan  (born on January 11, 1984), is an Armenian  scriptwriter, producer, singer and actor. He has been working for Armenia TV company since 2004.

Biography 
Grigor Danielyan was born on January 11, 1984, in Yerevan. In 2000 he graduated from "Quantum" college. In 2000-2005 he studied at the Yerevan State Institute of Economics. During his student years he played in the "Nar-Khoz" КВН team of the university. From 2003 to 2005, he assumed the position of the Chairman of the Culture Committee of the Student Council of the University. 

In 2005-2007, being a member of the "Ararat" team, he played in the "Premier League" of the Moscow КВН and represented Armenia. He is one of the founders of the Armenian Student "КВН". He has worked as an editor in the league since 2004.

In 2006-2008 he worked at "Ararat FM" radio station, hosted the "Morning Yerevan" program. He performs mainly in the humorous genre. He has been working for Armenia TV since 2006. He is the author, actor, screenwriter and producer of a number of projects.

He is married to singer Hripsime Yelinyan and has two sons, Alberto and Roberto.

Filmography

Discography

External links 

Grigor Danielyan at KINOPOISK

References

1984 births
Living people
Male actors from Yerevan
Film people from Yerevan
21st-century Armenian male singers
Armenian pop singers
Armenian male film actors
21st-century Armenian male actors